Hot Property is the third album by the British Pop, funk, disco band Heatwave.  Arranged, and primarily written by Rod Temperton, it was released  on the GTO record label in the United Kingdom, and the Epic label (number 35970) in the United States of America.  It was produced by Phil Ramone.

The album was remastered and reissued on compact disc (CD) with bonus tracks in 2010 by Big Break Records (CDBBR 0021).

Track listing

Personnel
Heatwave
Rod Temperton – writer / composer, rhythm track arrangements, vocal arrangements
Johnnie Wilder, Jr. – lead and backing vocals, percussion
Keith Wilder – lead vocals 
William L. Jones – lead and rhythm guitars
Roy Carter – rhythm and bass guitars, keyboards
Calvin Duke – organ, keyboards
Derek Bramble – bass
Ernest "Bilbo" Berger – drums, percussion

Charts

Hot Property failed to enter the UK Albums Chart.

Singles

References

External links

1979 albums
Heatwave (band) albums
Albums produced by Phil Ramone
GTO Records albums
Epic Records albums